Peter Leigh, more commonly known by the alias Nostalgia Nerd, is a British presenter, YouTuber, author and Twitch streamer, who documents and specialises in ageing technology and software. First appearing on YouTube in 2014, he routinely and enthusiastically explores forgotten computers and the technology surrounding them. He often specialises in historical documentaries on vintage computing, but also delves into technical explanations. Leigh also ventures into modern, mystery, explanation and more frivolous tech videos, with a humorous style and British wit.

His most recent book, The Nostalgia Nerd's Retro Tech, spent several months as a best-seller in the UK and USA. Covering a wide variety of retro systems with historical and gaming facts, it has been mentioned on the UK's Centre for Computing History's website and is a reference in the museum.

As of December 2022, his main YouTube channel has 520,000 subscribers and 674 videos.

Early life and education 
Leigh was born in Norwich, England in the early 1980s. The younger of two siblings, he spent much of his childhood engaging with such British micros as the ZX Spectrum, BBC Micro and models from further afield, including the Commodore 64.

He attended Cromer High School, before studying Business Law and ICT at Paston College. He previously worked as a Lead Program Developer, and ran a web development business in 2012.

Career 
Leigh first began producing YouTube videos in 2014, under the alias of RetroBait. He created the Nostalgia Nerd channel shortly after, and began creating videos as a part-time hobby. His early videos ranged from unboxing old tech to game reviews, before moving to in-depth system histories which propelled the channel forward. These are created in a documentary style, focused on the histories of various computer systems and consoles from the past.

In 2017, Leigh moved full-time to YouTube production. He stated that, due to the time involved with research, editing and production, along with the desire to improve quality and historical accuracy; continuing his parallel career of website development alongside video production would be detrimental to both pursuits; he preferring to put focus into video creation.

In 2018, Leigh appeared on Mexican television showcasing the retro computing scene in the UK. In the same year, he appeared in several episodes of the Kickstarter-backed web series, Digitiser the Show, as himself.

In 2018, Leigh wrote The Nostalgia Nerd's Retro Tech. This book was published in November 2018 by ILEX Press. To date, it has sold approximately 50,000 copies, and appeared in various scholar-related texts.

Leigh has appeared as a guest author in numerous national press publications, as well as UK radio shows, advocating retro technology. One of which was Chris Goreham's BBC Radio Norfolk breakfast show, where he discussed the mystery of the Elm Hill fossilised keyboard in Norwich.

On 3 February 2021, Leigh appeared on the UK based Channel 4 television show, Steph's Packed Lunch, discussing vintage computers and their values.

He frequently appears as a guest speaker at retro-themed events, including Play Expo by Replay Events, as well as a Primark retro themed clothing event alongside Pac-Man record holder, Jon Stoodley.

As of February 2021, Leigh has collaborated with several other significant YouTube producers, including LGR, Ashens, Did You Know Gaming, Octavius King and Slopes Game Room. He also co-hosts The Octanerdle podcast with Octavius King.

Notable documentaries 
Through source interviews, research and discovery, Nostalgia Nerd is known for creating content on an array of forgotten or unknown subjects related to vintage technology.

Examples include the explanation and deep dive into the early 00's 96KB FPS, kkrieger. The investigation and solving of the "Fossilised Keyboard Mystery", and various historical and research documentaries; including the rise and fall of Cyrix processors, the history of the failed internet sensation, Beenz, analysis of the alternative Sega Genesis Street Fighter 2 Game and a documentary about 1990s Star Trek PC Peripherals.

Personal life 

As of 2021, Leigh lives in Norwich, Norfolk. He has two children who have appeared in older videos.

Bibliography

Filmography

Television

Film

Web series

References

External links 
 

1980s births
Living people
Year of birth uncertain
English YouTubers
Media personalities from Norwich
YouTube channels launched in 2014
Technology YouTubers